This is a list of Polish by regions by gross regional product (GRP).

GRP per capita 

This is a list of regions of Poland by gross regional product (GRP) per capita shown in euros. Statistics shown are for 2019 levels.

GRP 

This is a list of regions of Poland by nominal gross regional product (GRP)  shown in billion euros. Statistics shown are for 2021 levels.

See also 
 Poland A and B

References

GRP
GRP
Voivodeships by GRP per capita
Poland